All Saints is a Docklands Light Railway (DLR) station in Poplar in East London. The station is named after nearby All Saints, a Church of England parish church dating from 1821 to 1823. The station entrance is on the East India Dock Road, the high street of Poplar and is opposite Chrisp Street Market while adjacent to the Poplar Baths, it also has two rail sidings directly west of the station forming part of Poplar DLR depot.

On-train announcements for trains approaching the station describe it as "All Saints for Chrisp Street Market".

History
There was a previous station on the same site, called Poplar station, which was served by the North London Railway. The location of this station can be seen in the bottom-right hand corner of the Map of Poplar, 1885.

Serco announced that from 24 August 2009, the frequency on the Stratford to Lewisham branch would be reduced at peak times to one train every seven minutes, from the current five-minute frequency. This was to accommodate a flyover that increased frequencies by 30 seconds on the Bank to Lewisham line.

Service
On the DLR, All Saints serves trains on only one branch: Stratford to Lewisham. The Stratford to Lewisham branch only runs during morning peak hours; at other times trains from Stratford terminate at Canary Wharf. Passengers bound for Bank, Tower Gateway, Beckton, or Woolwich Arsenal must change at Poplar.

Nearby places of interest
All Saints Church
Balfron Tower
Chrisp Street Market
Poplar Recreation Ground Memorial
Robin Hood Gardens

Connections
London bus routes 15, 108, 115, D6, N15, N551 serve All Saints DLR station.

References 

 Listed as All Saints LRT station

External links 

All Saints DLR live arrivals and more
Docklands Light Railway website – All Saints station page
Map of Poplar, 1885
Photograph of the platform at All Saints

Docklands Light Railway stations in the London Borough of Tower Hamlets
Railway stations in Great Britain opened in 1987
Poplar, London